Friedrich Christian Glume (25 March 1714 – 6 April 1752) was a German artist active during the reign of Frederick II of Prussia. The sculptural decorations above the entrance doors of Sanssouci were created by him.

References

German artists
1714 births
1752 deaths